Denys Molchanov and Andrei Vasilevski were the defending champions but only Molchanov chose to defend his title, partnering Aleksandr Nedovyesov. Molchanov lost in the semifinals to Sadio Doumbia and Fabien Reboul.

Doumbia and Reboul won the title after defeating Salvatore Caruso and Federico Gaio 4–6, 6–3, [10–3].

Seeds

Draw

References

External links
 Main draw

Brest Challenger - Doubles
2021 Doubles